Manyala Pranith (born 8 September 1993) is an Indian cricketer. He made his List A debut for Andhra in the 2017–18 Vijay Hazare Trophy on 11 February 2018. He made his Twenty20 debut for Andhra in the 2018–19 Syed Mushtaq Ali Trophy on 28 February 2019.

References

External links
 

1993 births
Living people
Indian cricketers
Place of birth missing (living people)
Andhra cricketers